Griegprisen (established 1972 in Bergen, Norway) is awarded by the «Edvard Grieg Museum Troldhaugen»  to a Norwegian musician, conductor or musicologist who in a special way have communicated the music of Edvard Grieg. It has also been awarded an extraordinary five times to people who have made a special effort to Edvard Grieg and Troldhaugen. The prize is awarded every year on the birthday of Edvard Grieg, 15 June.

Vinnere 
1972: Jens Harald Bratlie
1973: Arve Tellefsen
1974: Olav Eriksen
1975: Follesø Mannskor & Valter Aamodt
1976: Hindarkvartetten
1976: Sigmund Torsteinson (extraordinary)
1977: Edith Thallaug
1978: Jan Henrik Kayser, Anne Bolstad & Finn Nielsen
1979: Terje Tønnesen
1980: Eva Knardahl
1981: Finn Benestad & Dag Schjelderup-Ebbe
1981: Carl O. Gram Gjesdal (extraordinary)
1982: Bergen Filharmoniske Orkester & Karsten Andersen
1983: Det Norske Kammerorkester
1984: Ellen Westberg Andersen
1985: Bergen Domkantori & Magnar Mangersnes
1985: Johan Severud (extraordinary)
1986: Aage Kvalbein
1987: Marianne Hirsti
1988: Einar Steen-Nøkleberg
1989: Harald Bjørkøy
1990: Leif Ove Andsnes
1991: Truls Mørk
1992: Ole Kristian Ruud
1993: Elizabeth Norberg-Schulz
1994: Rikskonsertene / Fylkeskonsertane i Hordaland
1995: Jiri Hlinka
1996: Håvard Gimse
1997: Grieg Trio
1998: Henning Kraggerud & Helge Kjekshus
1999: Inger Elisabeth Haavet
2000: Bodil Arnesen & Erling Ragnar Eriksen
2001: Ragnhild Heiland Sørensen
2001: Lizsy Sandal (extraordinary)
2002: Not awarded
2003: Håkon Austbø
2004: Per Gynt-stemnet på Vinstra, by director Svein Sturla Hungnes & conductor: Eldar Nilsen
2005: Vertavo-kvartetten
2006: Per Vollestad & Sigmund Hjelset
2007: Bergen Filharmoniske Orkester & Ole Kristian Ruud
2007: Erling Dahl jr. (extraordinary)
2008: Not awarded
2009: Njål Sparbo
2010: Audun Kayser

References

External links 
 Griegprisen on BergenArtMuseum.no
 Griegprisen on KunstMuseene.no

Music in Bergen
Norwegian music awards
Awards established in 1972